Winder was a synthpop duo of Charlotte Jäger from Odense in Denmark and Heinz-Wilfried Burow from Hamburg, Germany. They released one album, International Love, in 1985, and three singles, "Run for Love", "Do It Right" and "International Love". "Run for Love" reached number 10 in the Danish charts. The following singles failed to chart. The band disbanded and disappeared into obscurity.

Discography

Albums
International Love (1985)

Singles
 "Run for Love" / "Give Me Your Love" (7" / 12" single) (1984)
 "Do It Right" / "I Close My Eyes" (7" / 12" single) (1985)
 "International Love" (1986)

References

External links
 Winder discography at Discogs

German new wave musical groups
Electronic music duos